An authorization to carry (ATC) is a permit issued by the Government of Canada under the Firearms Act. An ATC allows an individual to lawfully possess a restricted, or a specific class of, prohibited firearm that is loaded or possessed with readily accessible ammunition.

Under this permit, the approved firearm may be carried on the permit holder's person, in a holster. The issuing chief firearms officer may specify on the ATC that concealing the firearm is permitted, and may impose any other conditions deemed appropriate; for example, an ATC issued for armoured car work requires a uniform be worn while armed (see carry regulation SOR 98-207, Firearms Act).

This permit is less common than the authorization to transport permit which allows secured and trigger locked transport of restricted and prohibited-class firearms in an unloaded state.

See also
Firearms regulation in Canada

External links
 RCMP Information Sheet: Application for an Authorization to Carry Restricted Firearms and Prohibited Handguns
 Federal Statutes and Regulations > SOR/98-207

Canadian firearms law